Arzakan (previously known as Arzakyand), is a village in the Kotayk Province of Armenia. The Aghveran resort is located in Arzakan. There are the large ruins of the 10th- or 11th-century Neghutsi Vank, located along a ravine to the northwest of the village.  There are also the 13th-century monastic ruins of Ghuki Vank and 13th-century ruins of Surb Gevorg in the vicinity.

Gallery

See also 
Kotayk Province

References 

World Gazeteer: Armenia – World-Gazetteer.com

Populated places in Kotayk Province
Mountain resorts in Armenia